Santa Maria della Pietà may refer to: 

 Santi Bartolomeo ed Alessandro dei Bergamaschi, Rome
 Church of Santa Maria della Pietà, Abruzzo
 Church of Santa Maria della Pietà, Ferrara (Chiesa Teatini)
 Church of Santa Maria della Pietà, Palermo,
 Church of Santa Maria della Pietà, Venice
 Cappella Sansevero, Naples